Chloe Lee Rafferty (born 16 June 1999) is an Australian cricketer who plays as a right-arm medium pace bowler and right-handed batter for the ACT Meteors in the Women's National Cricket League. She played in three matches for the Hurricanes in the 2020–21 WBBL season and six matches for the Meteors in the 2020–21 WNCL season. She previously played for the Melbourne Stars and Victoria.

References

External links

Chloe Rafferty at Cricket Australia

1999 births
Living people
People from Williamstown, Victoria
Sportswomen from Victoria (Australia)
Cricketers from Victoria (Australia)
Australian women cricketers
ACT Meteors cricketers
Hobart Hurricanes (WBBL) cricketers
Melbourne Stars (WBBL) cricketers
Victoria women cricketers